Jason Millar (born 30 August 1970) is a former Australian rules footballer who played with the Brisbane Bears in the Australian Football League (AFL).

Millar, from Queensland Australian Football League (QAFL) club Caloundra, was the only Sunshine Coast product to play for the Bears.

A ruckman, he came to Brisbane as a zone selection and played his first game against North Melbourne at Brisbane's home ground Carrara Oval, finishing with eight disposals and six hit-outs.

He shared his debut with three other Bears players, Richard Champion, Troy Clarke and David Ogg.

Unlike the other three players, Millar wouldn't play another league game, with an injury sustained off the field ending his AFL career.

References

1970 births
Australian rules footballers from Queensland
Brisbane Bears players
Living people